Fernand Goyvaerts (24 October 1938 – 5 April 2004) was a Belgian international footballer. He played as an attacker.

Club career
He made his début for the first team of Club Brugge at the age of 16. In 1958, his penalty kick against CS Verviers was decisive for the promotion of Club to the highest level in Belgian football. He left Club Brugge in 1962 after a conflict with the Romanian coach Norberto Höfling. FC Barcelona paid 5 million Belgian franc for him. Two years later, he was voted best foreigner of the Primera División.

One year later, Goyvaerts left Barcelona for Real Madrid, making him the only Belgian still to have played for both Spanish giants. Due to injuries, he was never able to break through. He followed his coach Alfredo Di Stéfano to Elche CF.

In 1971, Goyvaerts returned to Belgium. He went from OGC Nice to Cercle Brugge. Goyvaerts would go on to play for SC Lokeren, WS Lauwe and RC Tournai.

International career
Though being one of the most talented Belgian footballers of his era, Goyvaerts only played 8 times for the Red Devils, his lone goal coming in a match against Netherlands. At the time, professional footballers were not allowed to play for the national team.

Retirement and death
After his footballing career, Goyvaerts worked as agent for several players. He died of a cerebral hemorrhage, aged only 65.

References

External links 
 Cerclemuseum.be
 Club Brugge
 El Mundo
 De Standaard
 The Independent
 

1938 births
2004 deaths
Belgian footballers
Belgium international footballers
Association football forwards
Belgian football managers
Club Brugge KV players
FC Barcelona players
Real Madrid CF players
La Liga players
Elche CF players
OGC Nice players
Ligue 1 players
Cercle Brugge K.S.V. players
K.S.C. Lokeren Oost-Vlaanderen players
Belgian Pro League players
Belgian expatriate footballers
Expatriate footballers in France
Expatriate footballers in Spain
Sportspeople from Mechelen
Footballers from Antwerp Province
Belgian expatriate sportspeople in Spain
Belgian expatriate sportspeople in France